José Escolástico Andrino (1817, in Guatemala City – July 14, 1862 in San Salvador) was a Salvadoran composer, considered to be the founder of the classical music scene in his country.  In 1845, he established a Conservatory in San Salvador, where he both composed and taught.  He wrote two symphonies, three masses, a set of variations for violin and orchestra, and one opera La Mora generosa (the Generous Blackberry).

References

1817 births
1862 deaths
Salvadoran composers
Male composers
Romantic composers
Music educators
People from Guatemala City
Guatemalan composers
19th-century classical composers
Male classical composers
Guatemalan emigrants to El Salvador
19th-century male musicians
19th-century musicians